The Trans-Gambia Highway is a major highway in The Gambia, running across the centre of the nation in a north–south direction.

Within the Gambia, the highway consists of two main stretches, the North Bank Road and South Bank Road, each corresponding to the parts of the country on either side of the Gambia River. The two roads ultimately connect via the Senegambia bridge at the village of Fatoto, at the far eastern end of the country. Prior to the building of the bridge, the crossing was served by a ferry.

The road is also economically important for Senegal, in which it is designated as the N4 road.

Geography
The Gambia is an elongated state forming a country that is almost surrounded by Senegal (but not an enclave, as it also borders the Atlantic Ocean).  The Gambia almost separates the Casamance region from the remainder of Senegal, with the only land borders being through dense, uninhabited forest.

South Bank Road

The southern portion of the Trans-Gambia Highway begins in the island capital city, Banjul, before crossing onto the mainland at the Denton Bridge. From here, the route passes through metropolitan Kombo and the principal cities of Kanifing, Serekunda, and Yundum, where it passes near the Banjul International Airport. Leaving the capital, the route proceeds along the full length of the southern half of the country, connecting the major towns of Brikama (36 km), Soma (185 km), Janjanbureh (319 km), Bansang (335 km), and Basse Santa Su (396 km) before terminating at Fatoto (436 km).

At Soma, the highway intersects with an extension of the Trans-Gambia Highway (also known as Senegal Route N4) that provides northward access to the town of Farafenni, on Gambia's northern bank, via the newly-opened Senegambia Bridge. If taken south into Senegal, N4 provides access to Casamance and Ziguinchor.

As of 2019, the South Bank Road is paved for its entire length. Aside from a short four-lane section in Kombo, the road is a two lane highway.

North Bank Road
The northern portion of the highway begins at Barra, at the Banjul–Barra Ferry. Heading eastward, the route traverses the full northern half of the country, passing through the major towns of Farafenni (113 km), Wassu (207 km), Laminkoto (227 km), and Sutukoba (325 km) before reaching the river ferry at Fatoto.

At Farafenni, the highway connects with the extension of the Trans-Gambia Highway (Route N4) that crosses the River Gambia at the Senegambia Bridge, linking the northern half of the Gambia with the town of Soma and points southward in Senegal. Taking N4 northward, meanwhile, leads into Senegal, in the direction of Kaolack and, eventually, Dakar.

As of 2019, the North Bank Road is paved for the distance between Barra and Laminkoto, with the remaining section under construction. The road is two lanes for its entire length.

Senegal
The Trans-Gambia Highway provides the most important connection between the two parts of Senegal.  As the N4, it runs from Kaolack and Nioro, across Gambia and then into Bignona and Ziguinchor in the Casamance.  The actual Gambian section is only 25 km long.

History
With establishment of the Gambia River Development Organization in 1978, plans for a bridge were developed. Despite being repeatedly raised, these plans have not come to fruition.

In August 2005, the Gambia River Authority doubled the prices for the ferry crossing.  In response, the Government of Senegal closed the border crossings.  The prices were reduced at the beginning of October, but Senegal felt the issue was unresolved and threatened that they would construct a tunnel under Gambia, with the claimed support of China.

President of the Gambia Yahya Jammeh and President of Senegal Abdoulaye Wade met on 21 October 2005 and reached an agreement over the fare and a basis for its future calculation. The bridge construction project was again placed into the foreground.

References

See also
Transport in Gambia
Transport in Senegal

Road transport in Senegal
Transport in the Gambia